The European–African–Middle Eastern Campaign Medal is a military award of the United States Armed Forces which was first created on November 6, 1942, by   issued by President Franklin D. Roosevelt.
The medal was intended to recognize those military service members who had performed military duty in the European Theater (to include North Africa and the Middle East) during the years of the Second World War.

History
The EAME Campaign Medal was initially established by Executive Order 9265, dated 6 November 1942, by President Franklin D. Roosevelt, and announced in War Department Bulletin 56, 1942. The European–African–Middle Eastern Campaign Medal was awarded as a service ribbon throughout the entire Second World War due to the ribbon design being approved by the Secretary of War in December 1942.

The medal design was submitted to the Commission of Fine Arts on 17 September 1946 and the first sample was completed in July 1947. The first recipient of the European–African–Middle Eastern Campaign Medal was General of the Army Dwight Eisenhower on 24 July 1947  in recognition of his service as Supreme Commander of the Allied Expeditionary Force during World War II.

The criteria were initially announced in Department of the Army (DA) Circular 84, dated 25 March 1948, and subsequently published in Army Regulation 600–65, dated 22 September 1948.
The Pacific Theater counterpart to the European–African–Middle Eastern Campaign Medal was the Asiatic–Pacific Campaign Medal.

Criteria
Originally known as the "EAME Ribbon", the European–African–Middle Eastern Campaign Medal is awarded for any service performed between December 7, 1941, and March 2, 1946, inclusive, provided such service was performed in the following geographical theater areas:  West boundary. -- From the North Pole, south along the 75th meridian west longitude to the 77th parallel north latitude, thence southeast through Davis Strait to the intersection of the 40th parallel north latitude and the 35th meridian west longitude, thence south along that meridian to the 10th parallel north latitude, thence southeast to the intersection of the equator and the 20th meridian west longitude, thence along the 20th meridian west longitude to the South Pole. East boundary—From the North Pole, south along the 60th meridian east longitude to its intersection with the eastern border of Iran, thence south along that border to the Gulf of Oman and the intersection of the 60th meridian east longitude, thence south along the 60th meridian east longitude to the South Pole.

Appearance

The medal's obverse was designed by Mr. Thomas Hudson Jones based on General Eisenhower's request that the medal include an invasion scene. The reverse side was designed by Adolph Alexander Weinman and is the same design as used on the reverse of the Asiatic–Pacific and American Campaign Medals.

On the obverse is a LST landing craft and troops landing under fire with an airplane in the background below the words EUROPEAN AFRICAN MIDDLE EASTERN CAMPAIGN. On the reverse, an American bald eagle close between the dates 1941 - 1945 and the words UNITED STATES OF AMERICA.

  Brown 67136 which represents the sands of Africa;
  each of Irish Green 67189, White 67101 and Scarlet 67111, representing Italy;
  Irish Green represents the green fields of Europe;
  each of Old Glory Blue 67178, White and Scarlet, taken from the American Defense Service Medal ribbon and refers to the continuance of American Defense after Pearl Harbor;
  Irish Green, again representing the green fields of Europe;
  each White, Black 67138, and White representing Germany; and lastly
  Brown, again representing the sands of Africa.

Devices
For those service members who participated in one or more designated military campaigns, campaign stars are authorized to be worn on the medal. The Arrowhead device is also authorized to be worn on the medal for those who participated in airborne or amphibious assault landings. The Fleet Marine Force Combat Operation Insignia is also authorized for wear on the medal for sailors attached to the Marine Corps.

US Army Campaigns

The following military campaigns are recognized by campaign stars on the European–African–Middle Eastern Campaign Medal.

For those service members who saw combat but did not participate in a designated campaign, the following "blanket campaigns" are authorized to the European–African–Middle Eastern Campaign Medal, denoted by campaign stars.

 Antisubmarine 7 Dec 41 - 8 May 1945
 Ground Combat 7 Dec 41 - 8 May 1945
 Air Combat: 7 Dec 41 - 8 May 1945

US Navy Campaigns 
The nine officially recognized US Navy campaigns in the European Theater of Operations are:

 North African occupation: allied landings in North Africa
 Sicilian occupation: allied landings in Sicily
 Salerno landings: allied landings in Southern Italy
 West Coast of Italy operations (1944): allied landing at Anzio and subsequent supply of the Anzio beachhead
 Invasion of Normandy: allied landings in Normandy
 Northeast Greenland operation
 Invasion of Southern France: allied landings in Southern France
 Reinforcement of Malta: allied convoys to supply besieged Malta
 Escort, antisubmarine, armed guard and special operations: 7 December 1941 – 2 September 1945

See also
Arrowhead device
Awards and decorations of the United States military

References

Birds in art
Europe, the Middle East and Africa
Military awards and decorations of the United States
Ships in art
United States campaign medals
Works by Adolph Weinman